Baroncea is a commune in Drochia District, Moldova. It is composed of two villages, Baroncea and Baroncea Nouă. At the 2004 census, the commune had 1,609 inhabitants.

References

Communes of Drochia District